Martinsilta (St. Martin's Bridge) is a beam bridge spanning the Aurajoki river in Turku, Finland. It was built in 1940, although a proposed bridge appeared on its present location already in the city plan that Carl Ludvig Engel created after the Great Fire of Turku of 1827.

The bridge is a one-way bridge crossing from Linnankatu to Itäinen Rantakatu in a south-southeast direction. The nearby Myllysilta bridge carries one-way traffic in the opposite direction. In 2010, due to the collapse of the Myllysilta bridge, Martinsilta was temporarily turned into a two-way bridge until Myllysilta was rebuilt and opened to traffic.

References

External links
 

Bridges in Finland
Buildings and structures in Turku
Transport in Turku